Gindre is a surname. Notable people with the surname include:

Gervais Gindre (1927–1990), French cross-country skier
Juan Gindre (1915–1990), Argentine sports shooter
Nick Gindre (born 1984), Argentine footballer
Robert Gindre (1911–1991), French cross-country skier

See also
Ginder